Kern Lake, originally Laguna de los Tulares, was the smallest of the three large lakes in the Tulare Basin, in the southwestern San Joaquin Valley of California.

It was the first of the lakes fed by the Kern River. Kern Lake is now a dry lake bed, due to agricultural diversion of the Kern River waters and the aquifer.

See also
Lake Isabella, modern lake of Kern River
Buena Vista Lake
List of lakes in California
Tulare Lake

References

Former lakes of the United States
Lakes of Kern County, California
Tulare Basin watershed
Endorheic lakes of California
Geography of the San Joaquin Valley
Kern River
Natural history of the Central Valley (California)
Lakes of Southern California
Lakes of California